Big Tom is a mountain located in the Catskill Mountains of New York north-northeast of Delhi. Big Tom is located northwest of Betts Hill and north of Hollister Hill.

References

Mountains of Delaware County, New York
Mountains of New York (state)